Superbabies: Baby Geniuses 2 (or Baby Geniuses 2: Superbabies or Baby Geniuses 2) is a 2004 American family comedy film directed by Bob Clark and written by Gregory Poppen, from a story by Steven Paul. The sequel to the 1999 film Baby Geniuses, it stars Jon Voight, Scott Baio, and Vanessa Angel. Following the events of the first film, four babies can communicate with each other using baby talk and have knowledge of many secrets. The baby geniuses become involved in a scheme by media mogul Bill Biscane, later revealed to be known as Kane, who kidnaps children everywhere. Helping the geniuses is a legendary super-baby named Kahuna who stops Biscane's plots and saves children from being kidnapped by Biscane and his minions. He joins up with several other babies in an attempt to stop Biscane, who intends to use a state-of-the-art satellite system to control the world's population by brainwashing them and forcing people to not be active and watch TV for the rest of their lives.

Like its predecessor, Superbabies: Baby Geniuses 2 was panned by critics and is often regarded as one of the worst films of all time. It was a box office bomb, earning less than half its budget back and was nominated at the 25th Golden Raspberry Awards for Worst Picture. It is the final film Bob Clark directed before his death in 2007. Three direct-to-video sequels followed the film, Baby Geniuses and the Mystery of the Crown Jewels (2013), Baby Geniuses and the Treasure of Egypt (2014), Baby Geniuses and the Space Baby (2015), with Voight appearing as various characters throughout the series.

Plot
The film starts with a group of babies in a daycare center. Archie, the cousin of Sly and Whit from the first Baby Geniuses, tells his friends, Finkleman, Alex, and Rosita, a story about Kahuna, his distant relative. He says Kahuna is a super baby with super strength and seemingly doesn't age, and he once rescued a group of children from an evil orphanage at the Berlin Wall run by a villainous overseer Adolf Hitler.

Back in the present day, Archie's father Stan Bobbins, Dan Bobbins's brother, who runs the daycare and a chain just like them, allows his center to be used as a filming location by the now TV mogul Biscane/Kane, who is starting up his own TV channel. Archie and the other babies sneak into Stan's office and decide to research Biscane but are caught. Archie overhears Biscane's helpers talking about their plan, accidentally attracting their attention, but he is rescued by Kahuna. Kylie the babysitter takes them all out to the children's museum, but Biscane's helpers accidentally knock their disc into the stroller. After a pursuit, Kahuna rescues them all; he then takes them all to his base. Kahuna transforms the babies into "superbabies": Archie is Baby Courageous, Alex is Bouncing Boy, Rosita is Cupid Girl, and Finkleman is Brain Boy.

Later, Archie eavesdrops on Kylie and Zach, Kahuna's helper; Zack tells her that Kahuna's father was a scientist and developed a formula for a potion. Kahuna enters the lab, and a mysterious person tries to drink the potion but accidentally chucks it when a storm breaks through the window. It lands and Kahuna drinks it, transforming him into a super baby. Kahuna's brother became jealous and annoyed at his brother, whom his friends call a freak. When the father died, Kahuna was put into an orphanage; after escaping, he set out to rescue babies and children everywhere.

The next day, Zack and Kylie find the disc that fell in the stroller earlier. The disc contains a clip of the program that is to be aired on Biscane's TV channel, followed by seemingly random code; they realize that Biscane is up to no good. The group spies on Biscane as he prepares to launch his channel, but Kahuna figures out that Biscane plans to take over the world through his TV channel by hypnotizing kids to never go outside, so he attacks the broadcast satellites, which causes him to disappear.

The babies decide to become their super alter egos to save Kahuna. With Stan, Archie's mom, Kylie, and Zack with them, they return to Kahuna's hideout and become Bounce Boy, Cupid Girl, Brain Boy, and Courageous Boy. After having escaped his prison, Kahuna arrives, followed by Biscane and his goons. Biscane manages to get the disc he needs and begins to air the hypnotic clip on TV. Biscane then reveals the truth that he is actually Kahuna's jealous older brother, and is revealed to be the person who tried to drink the potion. The babies then knock Biscane into Kahuna's machine which unlocks a person's true self with the push of a button. However, upon activating it he is surprisingly turned into a baby, to his despair, and argues with his assistant over who gets to change his diapers. Kahuna reverses Biscane's TV clip and all the children decide to run and play outside. Kahuna tells Archie that he must go and though they'll always be friends. Kahuna leaves in his flying vehicle, waving at him and saying he'll always be a hero.

Cast

Production
Jon Voight, co-executive producer for the first film, hinted a sequel in March 1999. The film was announced as part of Crystal Sky and producing partner Jon Voight's development slate in May 2000 with the working title, Baby Geniuses 2: The Return of the Big Kahuna.

Reception

Box office
Superbabies: Baby Geniuses 2 opened theatrically on August 27, 2004, in 1,276 venues, earning $3,251,856 in its opening weekend, ranking number eleven in the domestic box office. At the end of its run, on October 3, the film grossed $9,219,388 domestically and $229,256 overseas for a worldwide total of $9,448,644. Having an estimated $20 million budget, the film was a box office bomb.

Critical response
On review aggregator website Rotten Tomatoes, with 46 reviews, the film has a rare approval rating of 0%meaning no favorable reviews whatsoeverreceiving an average rating of 2.51/10. The site's consensus states: "A startling lack of taste pervades Superbabies, a sequel offering further proof that bad jokes still aren't funny when coming from the mouths of babes." Metacritic reports a 9 out of 100 rating, based on 19 critics, indicating "overwhelming dislike". Audiences polled by CinemaScore gave the film an average grade of "B−" on an A+ to F scale, the same grade earned by its predecessor.

Dave Kehr, in his New York Times review, said that the film was "not so much Look Who's Talking as Look Who's Walloping", and noted that the problem with the villain's "plan is that it is already in effect and endorsed by the FCC. It is called commercials." Writing for The Washington Post, Michael O'Sullivan stated, "The action sequences are phony-looking; the dialogue sounds largely improvised on the fly; the laughs are few and far between; and the acting ... is, to put it kindly, wooden."

Awards

Home media

The film was released on DVD and VHS on January 4, 2005.

See also
 List of films considered the worst

References

External links
 
 
 
 

2004 films
2000s English-language films
2000s science fiction comedy films
American children's comedy films
American science fiction comedy films
Child superheroes
2000s children's fantasy films
Crystal Sky Pictures films
Films scored by Paul Zaza
Films about babies
Films directed by Bob Clark
Films shot in Los Angeles
Films shot in Vancouver
Triumph Films films
2004 comedy films
2000s American films